{{Infobox short story | 
| name          = The Black Cat
| image         = 
| caption       = Early 20th-century illustration by Byam Shaw
| title_orig    =
| translator    =
| author        = Edgar Allan Poe
| country       = United States
| language      = English
| series        =
| genre         = Horror fiction, Gothic literature
| published_in  =
| publisher     = United States Saturday Post| media_type    = Print (periodical)

| preceded_by   =
| followed_by   =
| wikisource = The Black Cat (Poe)
}}

"The Black Cat" is a short story by American writer Edgar Allan Poe. It was first published in the August 19, 1843, edition of The Saturday Evening Post. In the story, an unnamed narrator has a strong affection for pets until he perversely turns to abusing them. His favorite, a pet black cat, bites him one night and the narrator punishes it by cutting its eye out and then hanging it from a tree. The home burns down but one remaining wall shows a burned outline of a cat hanging from a noose. He soon finds another black cat, similar to the first except for a white mark on its chest, but he soon develops a hatred for it as well. He attempts to kill the cat with an axe but his wife stops him; instead, the narrator murders his wife. He conceals the body behind a brick wall in his basement. The police soon come and, after the narrator's tapping on the wall is met with a shrieking sound, they find not only the wife's corpse but also the black cat that had been accidentally walled in with the body and alerted them with its cry.

The story is a study of the psychology of guilt,  often paired in analysis with Poe's "The Tell-Tale Heart". In both, a murderer carefully conceals his crime and believes himself unassailable, but eventually breaks down and reveals himself, impelled by a nagging reminder of his guilt. "The Black Cat", which also features questions of sanity versus insanity, is Poe's strongest warning against the dangers of alcoholism.

 Plot 
The story is presented as a first-person narrative using an unnamed unreliable narrator. He is a condemned man at the outset of the story. The narrator tells us that from an early age he has loved animals; he and his wife have many pets, including a large, beautiful black cat (as described by the narrator) named Pluto. This cat is especially fond of the narrator and vice versa. Their mutual friendship lasts for several years until the narrator becomes an alcoholic. One night, after coming home completely intoxicated, he believes the cat to be avoiding him. When he tries to seize it, the panicked cat bites the narrator, and in a fit of drunken rage he seizes the animal, pulls a pen-knife from his pocket, and deliberately gouges out the cat's eye.

From that moment on, the cat flees in terror at his master's approach. At first, the narrator is remorseful and regrets his cruelty. "But this feeling soon gave place to irritation. And then came, as if to my final and irrevocable overthrow, the spirit of perverseness."  In another fit of drunken fury, the narrator takes the cat out in the garden one morning and ties a noose around its neck, hanging it from a tree where it dies. That very night his house mysteriously catches fire, forcing the narrator, his wife and their servant to flee the premises.

The next day, the narrator returns to the ruins of his home to find, imprinted on the single wall that survived the fire, the apparition of a gigantic cat with a rope around the animal's neck.

Though initially disturbed, the narrator gradually determines a logical explanation for it; someone outside had cut the cat from the tree and thrown its corpse into the bedroom to awaken him during the fire. The narrator begins to miss Pluto and hate himself for his actions, feeling guilty. Some time later, he finds a similar cat in a tavern, being the same size and color as the original and even missing an eye; the only difference is a large white patch on the cat's chest. The narrator takes it home, but soon begins to fear and loathe the cat, as it amplifies his guilty conscience. After some time, the white patch of fur begins to take shape and, much to the narrator's horror, forms the shape of the gallows. This terrifies and angers him more, and he avoids the cat whenever possible.

Then, one day when the narrator and his wife are visiting the cellar in their new home, the cat gets under its master's feet and nearly trips him down the stairs. The infuriated narrator attempts to kill the cat with an axe but is stopped by his wife. Failing to take out his drunken fury on the cat, he angrily kills his wife with the axe instead. He seals his wife's corpse in a wall in the cellar. A few days later, when the police arrive to investigate the wife's disappearance, they find nothing and the narrator goes free. The cat, which he intended to kill as well, has also gone missing. This grants him the freedom to sleep, even with the burden of murder.

On the last day of the investigation, the narrator accompanies the still-clueless police into the cellar. Completely confident in his own safety, the narrator comments on the sturdiness of the building and taps upon the wall he had built around his wife's body. A loud, inhuman screaming sound fills the room. The alarmed police tear down the wall and find the wife's corpse. Sitting on the corpse's rotting head, to the utter horror of the narrator, is the screeching black cat. The terrified narrator is immediately shattered completely by this reminder of his crime—which he had believed to be safe from discovery—and the appearance of the cat. As he words it: "I had walled the monster up within the tomb!"

 Publication history 

"The Black Cat" was first published in the August 19, 1843, issue of The Saturday Evening Post. At the time, the publication was using the temporary title United States Saturday Post. The story was reprinted in The Baltimore Sun and The Pensacola Gazette that same year. Readers immediately responded favorably to the story, spawning parodies including Thomas Dunn English's "The Ghost of the Grey Tadpole".

 Analysis 
Like the narrator in Poe's "The Tell-Tale Heart", the narrator of "The Black Cat" is of questionable sanity. In the beginning of the tale, the narrator says that he would be "mad indeed" should he expect a reader to believe the story, implying that he has already been accused of madness.

The extent to which the narrator claims to have loved his animals suggests mental instability in the form of having “too much of a good thing”. His partiality for animals substitutes “the paltry friendship and gossamer fidelity of mere Man”. Since the narrator's wife shares his love of animals, he likely thinks of her as another pet, seeing as he distrusts and dislikes humans. Additionally, his failure to understand his excessive love of animals foreshadows his inability to explain his motives for his actions.

One of Poe's darkest tales, "The Black Cat" includes his strongest denunciation of alcohol. The narrator's perverse actions are brought on by his alcoholism, a "disease" and "fiend" which also destroys his personality. The use of the black cat evokes various superstitions, including the idea voiced by the narrator's wife that they are all witches in disguise. Poe owned a black cat. In his "Instinct vs Reason – A Black Cat" he stated: "The writer of this article is the owner of one of the most remarkable black cats in the world – and this is saying much; for it will be remembered that black cats are all of them witches."  In Scottish and Irish mythology, the Cat-sìth is described as being a black cat with a white spot on its chest, not unlike the cat the narrator finds in the tavern. The eponymous cat is named Pluto after the Roman god of the Underworld.

Although Pluto is a neutral character at the beginning of the story, he becomes antagonistic in the narrator's eyes once the narrator becomes an alcoholic. The alcohol pushes the narrator into fits of intemperance and violence, to the point at which everything angers him – Pluto in particular, who is always by his side, becomes the malevolent witch who haunts him even while avoiding his presence. When the narrator cuts Pluto's eye from its socket, this can be seen as symbolic of self-inflicted partial blindness to his own vision of moral goodness.

The fire that destroys the narrator's house symbolizes the narrator's "almost complete moral disintegration". The only remainder is the impression of Pluto upon the wall, which represents his unforgivable and incorrigible sin.

From a rhetorician's standpoint, an effective scheme of omission that Poe employs is diazeugma, or using many verbs for one subject; it omits pronouns. Diazeugma emphasizes actions and makes the narrative swift and brief.

 Adaptations 

In 1910–11, Futurist artist Gino Severini painted "The Black Cat" in direct reference to Poe's short story.
Universal Pictures made two films titled The Black Cat, one in 1934, starring Bela Lugosi and Boris Karloff, and another in 1941, starring Lugosi and Basil Rathbone. Both films claimed to have been "suggested by" Poe's story, but neither bears any resemblance to the tale, aside from the presence of a black cat. Elements of Poe's story were, however, used in the 1934 film Maniac.
"The Black Cat" was adapted into a seven-page comic strip in Yellowjack Comics #1 (1944).
Sept. 18, 1947, Mystery in the Air radio program with Peter Lorre as the protagonist in "The Black Cat". Note: the cat's eye is not gouged out. Instead, the cat's ear is torn.
The middle segment of director Roger Corman's 1962 anthology film Tales of Terror combines the story of "The Black Cat" with that of another Poe tale, "The Cask of Amontillado." This version stars Peter Lorre as the main character (given the name Montresor Herringbone) and Vincent Price as Fortunato Luchresi. The amalgamation of the two stories provides a motive for the murderer: Fortunato has an affair with Montresor's wife.
In 1966, The Black Cat, a version directed by Harold Hoffman and loosely based on Poe's story, was released starring Robert Frost, Robyn Baker and Sadie French.
In 1970, Czech writer Ludvík Vaculík made many references to "A Descent into the Maelström", as well as "The Black Cat", in his novel .
In 1972, Poe's story was adapted in the Italian horror-giallo film Your Vice Is a Locked Room and Only I Have the Key, directed by Sergio Martino and starring Edwige Fenech, Anita Strindberg and Luigi Pistilli. 
In 1973, James Stewart recorded a reading of "The Black Cat" for BBC Radio.
Writer/director Lucio Fulci's 1981 film The Black Cat is loosely based on Poe's tale.
The 1990 film Two Evil Eyes presents two Poe tales, "The Facts in the Case of M. Valdemar" and "The Black Cat." The former was written and directed by George A. Romero, while the latter was written and directed by Dario Argento. This version stars Harvey Keitel in the lead role.
In 1997, a compilation of Poe's work was released on a double CD entitled Closed on Account of Rabies, with various celebrities lending their voices to the tales. "The Black Cat" was read by avant-garde performer Diamanda Galás.
"The Black Cat" was adapted and performed with "The Cask of Amontillado" as Poe, Times Two: Twin tales of mystery, murder...and mortar—a double-bill of short, one-man plays written and performed by Greg Oliver Bodine. First produced in NYC at Manhattan Theatre Source in 2007, and again at WorkShop Theater Company in 2011. Part of the 2012 season at Cape May Stage in Cape May, NJ.
"The Black Cat" is the 11th episode of the second season (2007) of the television series Masters of Horror. The plot essentially retells the short story in a semi-autobiographical manner, with Poe himself undergoing a series of events involving a black cat which he used to inspire the story of the same name.
In 2012, Big Fish Games released a point and click mystery game loosely based on the story called Edgar Allan Poe's The Black Cat: Dark TalesIn 2011, Hyper Aware Theater Company produced "The Black Cat", one of several Poe stage adaptations written by Lance Tait, as part of its “Gutterdrunk: The Poe Revisions” in New York City. Ava Caridad has written that in this stage adaptation the “unreliable narrator [has been changed] from male to female”... and this narrator has been split “into two separate characters representing one person.”
 The 2020 Ahoy Comics comic book Edgar Allan Poe's Snifter of Blood'' #1 includes a pastiche of the story by Paul Cornell and Russell Braun under the title "The Black Cat Dog". As the title suggests, the cat is replaced by a dog, who also narrates the story. However, he refuses to see his master in a bad light and is utterly unaware of the man's hatred or guilt.

References

External links 

 Project Gutenberg: The Works of Edgar Allan Poe, Volume 2
 Complete Text at E. A. Poe Society of Baltimore
 Full text on PoeStories.com with hyperlinked vocabulary words
 The Poe Decoder: The Black Cat
 
 Illustration and description of Severini's painting
 The Black Cat reading by Gerry Hay

1843 short stories
Short stories by Edgar Allan Poe
Horror short stories
Fiction about animal cruelty
Fiction with unreliable narrators
Fictional cats
Works originally published in The Saturday Evening Post
Short stories adapted into films
Uxoricide in fiction